This is a list of notable restaurant districts and streets in the United States. Restaurant districts and streets are sometimes referred to as "restaurant row".

Restaurant districts and streets in the United States

Adams Morgan, Washington, D.C
Beale Street, Memphis, Tennessee
Brewery District, Columbus, Ohio
Buffington Harbor, Gary, Indiana
Buford Highway, Atlanta, Georgia
Capitol Hill (Denver), Colorado
Chinatown, Boston, Massachusetts
Chinatown, Las Vegas, Nevada
Chinatown (Washington, D.C.)
Delmar Loop, St. Louis, MO
Crockett Street, Beaumont, Texas
East 4th Street District (Cleveland), Ohio
Ferry Street, Newark, New Jersey
French Quarter, New Orleans, Louisiana
Garment District (Kansas City, Missouri)
Greektown, Baltimore, Maryland
Greektown, Chicago, Illinois
Hyde Park, Boise, Idaho
Little Italy, Baltimore, Maryland
Little Italy, Chicago, Illinois
Little Italy, Omaha, Nebraska
Little Italy, Paterson, New Jersey
Mahatma Gandhi District, Houston, Texas
Murrells Inlet, South Carolina
North End, Boston, Massachusetts
Northside, Cincinnati, Ohio
Old Market (Omaha, Nebraska)
River Market District, Little Rock, Arkansas
San Antonio River Walk, Texas
Soho (Tampa), Florida
South Norwalk, Connecticut
South Trenton, New Jersey
Wooster Square, New Haven, Connecticut

California
Belden Place, San Francisco, California
Broadway Corridor, Long Beach, California
Chinatown, Los Angeles, California
Gourmet Ghetto,  neighborhood in Berkeley, California
Hillcrest, San Diego, California
Pacific Beach, San Diego, California
Restaurant Row (Beverly Hills), California
North Beach, San Francisco, California
Old Armenian Town, Fresno, California

New York
Allentown, Buffalo, New York

New York City:
Arthur Avenue
Chinatown, Manhattan, New York
Curry Row
Curry Hill
Koreatown, Manhattan
Little Brazil, Manhattan, New York
Little Italy, Manhattan, New York
Restaurant Row (Manhattan), New York
Woodside, Queens, New York

Related lists
By U.S. state
List of restaurants in Hawaii
List of restaurants in New Jersey
List of restaurants in Rhode Island

By city location
List of restaurants in Albuquerque, New Mexico
List of restaurants in Atlanta
List of restaurants in Baltimore
List of restaurants in Boston
List of restaurants in Cambridge, Massachusetts
List of restaurants in Cincinnati
List of restaurants in Houston
List of restaurants in the Las Vegas Valley
List of restaurants in New York City
List of restaurants in Portland, Oregon
List of restaurants in Seattle

See also
 List of restaurant districts and streets
 Lists of restaurants

References

Further reading
 

 
 

Restaurant districts and streets in the United States
Restaurants
Lists of places in the United States
Restaurant
United States